Erling Trondsen (born 28 December 1959) is a Paralympic swimmer from Norway. He has won 20 medals, thirteen of them gold, between 1976 and 1992. 

Trondsen is currently an organizer in disabled beach volleyball. and coach.

References 

1959 births
Living people
Paralympic swimmers of Norway
Paralympic gold medalists for Norway
Paralympic silver medalists for Norway
Paralympic bronze medalists for Norway
Swimmers at the 1976 Summer Paralympics
Swimmers at the 1980 Summer Paralympics
Swimmers at the 1984 Summer Paralympics
Swimmers at the 1988 Summer Paralympics
Swimmers at the 1992 Summer Paralympics
Medalists at the 1976 Summer Paralympics
Medalists at the 1980 Summer Paralympics
Medalists at the 1984 Summer Paralympics
Medalists at the 1988 Summer Paralympics
Medalists at the 1992 Summer Paralympics
Place of birth missing (living people)
Paralympic medalists in swimming
Norwegian male backstroke swimmers
Norwegian male breaststroke swimmers
Norwegian male butterfly swimmers
Norwegian male freestyle swimmers
Norwegian male medley swimmers
S8-classified Paralympic swimmers
Medalists at the World Para Swimming Championships
20th-century Norwegian people